"Odelo" is the third single by Serbian new wave band Električni Orgazam and the second single from the Lišće prekriva Lisabon album.

Track listing 
Both tracks written by Srđan Gojković
 "Odelo" (2:00)
 "Afrika" (1:55)

Personnel 
 Srđan Gojković (guitar, vocals)
 Ljubomir Đukić (keyboards, vocals)
 Jovan Jovanović (bass)
 Goran Čavajda (drums, percussion)
 Ljubomir Jovanović (guitar)

External links 
 EX YU ROCK enciklopedija 1960-2006, Janjatović Petar; 
 Odelo / Afrika at Discogs

1982 singles
Električni Orgazam songs
Albums recorded in Slovenia
1982 songs
Jugoton singles